The A63 autoroute is a motorway in southwest France, connecting Bordeaux (from Junction 15 of the Rocade) to the border with Spain and Basque Country via the Autopista AP-8. The motorway, rather than being a purpose-built route, is an upgrade of the former RN10, which became a full toll road and no longer exists south of Bordeaux. The motorway crosses Les Landes (moorland) as a dual-carriageway.

Route
The A63 connects the border with Spain at Biriatou (close to Hendaye) at the southern edge of the Landes (department) towards Bordeaux which it reaches at junction 15 of rocade).

It is part of the Autoroute des Estuaires and is used by lorries from all over Europe heading to the Iberian peninsula. In addition, the road is connected at Bayonne with the A64 to Pau, Tarbes and Toulouse.

The northern section has junctions with the A660.

History
The A63 was operated by the Autoroute Company de la Cote Basque (ACOBA) in 1984. 
The first section to open was the by-pass of Saint-Jean-de-Luz in 1972. 
ACOBA was integrated into the ASF.

List of junctions
{| class="plainrowheaders wikitable"
|-
!scope=col|Department
!scope=col|Location
!scope=col|km
!scope=col|mi
!scope=col|Junction
!scope=col|Destinations
!scope=col|Notes
|-
|rowspan="7"|Pyrénées-Atlantiques
|rowspan="1"|Biriatou
|0.04
|0.03
| - Junction 1
|Hendaye, Biriatou
|Peage de Biriatou
|-
|rowspan="1"|Urrugne
|7.4
|4.6
| - Junction 2
|Saint-Jean-de-Luz, Urrugne, Ciboure
|
|-
|rowspan="1"|Saint-Jean-de-Luz
|12.9
|8.0
| - Junction 3
|Saint Jean de Luz - Nord
|
|-
|rowspan="1"|Biarritz
|21.7
|13.5
| - Junction 4
|Biarritz, Biarritz Airport
|Péage de Biarritz-La Négresse
|-
|rowspan="3"|Bayonne
|26.6
|16.5
| - Junction 5
|Bayonne, Anglet
|Péage Bayonne-Sud
|-
|30.7
|19.1
|
|
|
|-
|32.8
|20.4
| - Junction 6
|Bayonne, Pau
|
|-
|rowspan="12"|Landes
|rowspan="1"|Ondres
|39
|24.2
| - Junction 7
|Labenne, Boucau-Tarnos, Ondres
|
|-
|rowspan="1"|Benesse-Maremne
|48.8
|30.3
| - Junction 8
|Seignosse, Hossegor, Capbreton
|Péage de Benesse-Maremne
|-
|rowspan="2"|Saint-Geours-de-Maremne
|65.2
|40.5
| - Junction 9
|Mont de Marsan, Dax
|Exit/Entry to D824 only
|-
|67.2
|41.8
| - Junction 10
|Vieux-Boucau, Soustons
|
|-
|rowspan="1"|Magescq
|74.9
|46.5
| - Junction 11
|Léon, Moliets-et-Maa, Magescq
|
|-
|rowspan="1"|Castets
|87.6
|54.4
| - Junction 12
|Vielle-Saint-Girons, Castets
|
|-
|rowspan="1"|Lesperon
|101
|62.8
| - Junction 13
|Lit-et-Mixe, Rion-des-Landes
|
|-
|rowspan="1"|Onesse-Laharie
|111
|69
| - Junction 14
|Mimizan, Morcenx
|
|-
|rowspan="1"|Escource
|122
|75.8
| - Junction 15
|Sabres, Escource
|
|-
|rowspan="1"|Labouheyre
|129
|80.2
| - Junction 16
|Labouheyre
|
|-
|rowspan="1"|Liposthey
|143
|88.9
| - Junction 17
|Biscarrosse, Parentis-en-Born, Liposthey
|
|-
|rowspan="1"|Saugnac-et-Muret
|153
|95.1
| - Junction 18
|Saugnac-et-Muret
|
|-
|rowspan="9"|Gironde
|rowspan="1"|Belin-Béliet
|159
|98.8
| - Junction 20
|Belin-Béliet
|Northbound exit only/Southbound entry only
|-
|rowspan="1"|Salles
|169
|105
| - Junction 21
|Salles
|
|-
|rowspan="2"|Mios
|181
|112.5
| - Junction 22
|Biganos, Gujan-Mestras, Arcachon
|
|-
|184
|114.3
| - Junction 23
|Lacanau, Le Barp, Marcheprime
|
|-
|rowspan="2"|Cestas
|193
|119.9
| - Junction 24
|Saint Jean d'Illac
|
|-
|199
|123.7
| - Junction 25
|Cestas
|
|-
|rowspan="1"|Granet
|202
|125.5
|Chemin de la Briqueterie - Junction 26b
|Canejan
|Northbound entry only / Southbound exit only
|-
|rowspan="2"|Canéjan
|203
|126.1
|Avenue du Haut Leveque - Junction 26
|Gradignan, Canéjan
|Northbound exit only / Southbound entry only
|-
|204
|126.8
|Avenue du Haut Leveque - Junction 26a
|Gradignan, Canéjan
|Northbound entry only / Southbound exit only
|-

A660
Exchange A63-A660 Junction with the A63     
01 (Lacanau de Mios) km 2 Towns served:     
02 (Facture-Biganos) km 4 Towns served:     
03 (Le Teich) km 10 Towns served:     
Roundabout Point Gujan-Mestras Junction with RD650     
Roundabout Point La Hume Junction with RN250

Future
 The southern section will be widened to three lanes over the next few years.
 It is planned to upgrade the RN10 across the Landes.
 The northern section would become part of a new ring road for Bordeaux. This however is a controversial road project.

References

External links
 A63 Motorway on Saratlas
 Web site of Atlandes

A63